The Sumatran Numismatic Museum (id:) is a museum located in Medan, Indonesia. Established in 2017, the museum is dedicated to the history of money in Indonesia and houses a significant collection of objects.

Description 
The museum was established in 2017 by Saparudin Barus, an avid collector. The museum's extensive collection contains objects from historical nations located in Southeast Asia, coins from the Dutch colonial period and Dutch East Indies, and from modern-day Indonesia. Artifacts include coins, stamps, tokens, coupons, and paper money.

External links 
Collaboration with Wikimedia Indonesia

References 

Museums established in 2017
History of currency
2017 establishments in Indonesia
Tourist attractions in Sumatra